Linda Stirling (born Louise Schultz; October 11, 1921 – July 20, 1997) was an American showgirl, model, and actress. In her later years, she had a second career as a college English professor for more than two decades. She is most famous for her roles in movie serials.

Early years
The daughter of Mr. and Mrs. Alex Schultz, Stirling was born in Long Beach, California. She attended Burnett Grammar School, George Washington Junior High School, and Long Beach Polytechnic High School.

She began studying drama when she was 12, and she eventually studied for two years at Ben Bard's Academy of Dramatic Arts. She also was active in the Long Beach Players' Guild.

Stirling worked as a model for photographers and acted in summer stock theater.

Film 
In the book In the Nick of Time: Motion Picture Sound Serials, William C. Cline wrote, "Of the characteristics necessary in a heroine, Linda Stirling possessed all — presence, wholesomeness, beauty and versatility — and any single one would have been sufficient in her case."

Stirling's first role was as a model in The Powers Girl in 1943 and her first role in a serial was the title character in The Tiger Woman (1944). She was featured as the heroine in Zorro's Black Whip (1944).

After her marriage, she essentially retired from films to raise a family, although she later appeared in occasional episodes of television shows, beginning in 1952.

Later years 
After her career as an actress ended, and her children had grown, Stirling earned her Bachelor's and her Master's degree at UCLA.  With her degree in hand, Stirling began a new career as a teacher of college English and Drama in the 1960s at Glendale College in Glendale, California between 1967 and 1992.

In her later life, Stirling sought to distance herself in the classroom from her Hollywood past, but still remained active on the film convention circuit until the last years of her life. She also appeared in a 1990 documentary on Republic Pictures, the studio where she did the bulk of her work.

Personal life
In 1946, she married Republic screenwriter Sloan Nibley. They had two sons.

Death 
Stirling died of cancer in Studio City, Los Angeles, California in 1997.

Recognition 
Stirling was one of the original winners of the Golden Boot Awards in 1983 for her contributions to western cinema.

Filmography

References

External links
 

 
 
 Linda Stirling at B-Westerns.com
 Linda Stirling Article at Todd Gault's Serial Experience
 WW2 Glamour Girl Parade at The Barracks Wall: World War Two Pin-ups

1921 births
1997 deaths
20th-century American actresses
Actresses from Long Beach, California
American film actresses
American television actresses
Female models from California
Deaths from cancer in California
Film serial actresses
Western (genre) film actresses
University of California, Los Angeles alumni